These are lists of the tallest buildings on the Gold Coast, Queensland, Australia. In accordance with CTBUH guidelines, heights are measured to the structural height, which includes architectural elements, such as spires, but not communications antennas. Structures are not included.

Despite its status as Australia's sixth largest city, the Gold Coast has the fourth-greatest number of skyscrapers in Australia, with 11 buildings at a height of 150 metres or taller, after Melbourne, Sydney, and Brisbane.

Tallest completed and topped out buildings
Height: R = Roof, P = Pinnacle (top of spire or antenna)

Proposed, approved and under construction buildings shown

It is noted some of the proposed or under construction buildings on the Gold Coast have been scaled back, gone into receivership or cancelled due to the Global Financial Crisis and lack of finance and investment among other factors on the Gold Coast.

See also

 List of tallest buildings in Australia
 List of tallest buildings in Oceania

References

External links 
 Tallest skyscrapers - Gold Coast City on Emporis

Buildings and structures on the Gold Coast, Queensland
 
Gold Coast, Queensland
Lists of buildings and structures in Queensland
Gold Coast, Queensland-related lists